The women's 200 metres event at the 2009 Asian Athletics Championships was held at the Guangdong Olympic Stadium on November 12–13.

Medalists

Results

Heats
Wind:Heat 1: -0.6 m/s, Heat 2: +2.5 m/s, Heat 3: +0.5 m/s, Heat 4: +1.8 m/s

Semifinal
Wind: Heat 1: -0.5 m/s, Heat 2: 0.0 m/s

Final
Wind: +0.9 m/s

References
Results

2009 Asian Athletics Championships
200 metres at the Asian Athletics Championships
2009 in women's athletics